USS San Antonio (LPD-17), the lead ship of her class of amphibious transport dock or landing platform dock, is the first ship of the United States Navy to be named for the city of San Antonio, Texas.

Construction

Design improvements

San Antonio is the first U.S. Navy vessel to incorporate new crew comfort features, including bunks with increased headroom, in-rack fans, and pull-out laptop computer shelves.

She is also the largest U.S. Navy vessel to incorporate stealth features, with close attention paid to exterior shaping. Shaping features include:
 Major antennas are mounted on platforms inside two Advanced Enclosed Mast/Sensor systems rather than on traditional mast yardarms that expose antennas to the environment.
 Deck edges are bounded by shaped bulwarks rather than lifeline stanchions. These bulwarks are hollow and double as storage lockers, eliminating locker clutter on decks.
 Exterior equipment is recessed or flush-mounted where possible, giving the ship a clean exterior appearance. Any equipment that cannot be flush-mounted (such as ladders) incorporate shaping features of their own.
 The boat-handling crane at the center of the ship folds into a clean shape when not in use.
 The anchor and anchor pocket are shaped to minimize radar backscatter.

Contract award and build
On 17 December 1996, the U.S. Navy awarded a contract to an industrial alliance led by Northrop Grumman Ship Systems (formerly Litton Avondale), with General Dynamics Bath Iron Works, Raytheon Electronic Systems and Intergraph Corporation, to design and construct the first of an anticipated 12 ships under the Navy's LPD-17 program.

The keel was laid down on 9 December 2000. The ship was launched on 12 July 2003 and christened on 19 July by Senator Kay Bailey Hutchison of Texas. She was originally scheduled to be commissioned 17 July 2002, but was delayed by problems at the Avondale shipyard, which resulted in her being towed from New Orleans to the Northrop Grumman shipyard at Pascagoula, Mississippi, in December 2004 for completion.

The Navy took delivery three days before Hurricane Katrina hit in August 2005. Work was delayed further when the ship became a base for regional relief efforts, including accommodations for some shipyard workers, the National Guard, Navy diving and salvage personnel and government officials. The ship's final cost was $840 million over budget.

Commissioning
She was finally commissioned 14 January 2006, at NS Ingleside, Texas. Guest speakers included former U.S. President George H. W. Bush. Senator Hutchison, the ship's sponsor, gave the crew the customary first command, "Man our ship, and bring her to life!" After commissioning she was sent to her home port of Norfolk, Virginia.

Ship history

2003
USS San Antonio was built by Northrop Grumman Ship Systems in New Orleans, the 684-foot, 25,000-ton vessel was launched on 12 July 2003, and christened one week later. It had been scheduled to be commissioned on 17 July 2002, but was delayed by poor performance at the Avondale shipyard, which resulted in it being towed from New Orleans to the Northrop Grumman shipyard at Pascagoula, Miss., in December 2004 for completion. The ship was unable to move under its own power at that time, despite having been christened more than a year earlier.

2009
In 2009, San Antonio served as a flagship for Combined Task Force 151, the multi-national anti-piracy naval force off Somalia. During the ship's time off Africa, the crew boarded 20 foreign vessels. The crew discovered hidden explosives on one of the vessels. The ship returned to Norfolk on 27 March 2009.

2013
In August 2013, the Navy confirmed that San Antonio had entered into the eastern Mediterranean Sea. They stressed it was a long-planned action and not related to the arrival of destroyers which had been stationed there due to the conflict in Syria. Officials thought it prudent to keep the ship near the destroyers, given the situation. In October 2013, Al Qaeda operative Abu Anas al-Libi was seized in Libya and then transferred to San Antonio to await transport to the United States for a trial and questioning.

2016
On 12 October 2016, San Antonio and destroyer  were transiting through the southern end of the Red Sea when missiles were fired at them from Houthi-controlled territory in Yemen. Neither ship was harmed. In response to the attack on Mason and San Antonio, the destroyer  launched five cruise missiles against three radar sites in Yemen that U.S. officials believe targeted the U.S. ships.

On 21 October 2016, San Antonio deployed to the Mediterranean Sea as part of Operation Odyssey Lightning to replace amphibious assault ship , which was carrying out operations against ISIS. San Antonio carried UH-1 Y Hueys and AH-1 W Cobras from the 22nd MEU's Aviation Combat Unit, VMM-264; Marine Harrier fighters were part of the operation aboard Wasp.

Criticism
Nearly three years after commissioning, problems persisted with this first-in-class vessel. On 27 January 2006, a contract worth over $6 million was awarded to Northrop Grumman, for the Post-Shakedown Availability of San Antonio. Work was expected to be completed by April 2007. On 22 June 2007, Secretary of the Navy Donald C. Winter sent a letter to Northrop Grumman outlining problems with the ship, from leaks to steerage issues, stating, "Twenty-three months after commissioning of LPD-17, the Navy still does not have a mission-capable ship."

One week prior to deployment refrigerated storage went down. Refrigerated units were craned onto the flight deck to store deployment provisions while repairs were conducted. On the day of deployment the stern gate failed to function causing a delay of two days.

In November 2008, two months into her maiden deployment, San Antonio had been forced to undergo an unplanned maintenance stop in Bahrain due to leaks in its lube oil piping system.

During a February 2009 transit of the Suez Canal, with both shafts at full power, one shaft suddenly went into reverse, sending the vessel careening out of control and narrowly missing other ships and running aground.

During an anti-piracy mission in February 2009, one of the ship's crew, Petty Officer 1st Class Theophilus K. Ansong, 34, of Bristol, Virginia, was killed in a small boat accident in the Gulf of Aden. The ship's captain, Commander Eric C. Cash, was reprimanded over the incident at an admiral's mast by Admiral J.C. Harvey Jr., the commander of Fleet Forces Command. Another officer, Lieutenant Commander Sean Kearns, the ship's executive officer refused a mast over the same incident and was court-martialed in October and November 2010. During the trial, his defense team presented evidence of the ship's numerous deficiencies and lack of written procedures as contributing to the accident. Kearns was acquitted of the charges on 5 November 2010. Kearns stated that the ship's officers had been pressured by the Navy to declare the ship ready to deploy even though they knew that it still had significant, unresolved problems.

In response to these problems the Navy finally obtained approval to hire a sufficient number Supervisor of Shipbuilding officers in 2009.

In October 2010, the Department of Defense released a report outlining numerous engineering flaws in San Antonio. A top aide in the Department of Defense was quoted as saying that Northrop Grumman's ships are "not effective, suitable and not survivable in combat". The report also blamed Raytheon, a subcontractor providing fiber optics, electrical and anti-missile systems for San Antonio, for "persistent engineering deficiencies."

In April 2011 after nearly two years of constant repair work at various shipyards in Norfolk, Virginia, the Navy started an investigation into the constant mechanical and engineering issues with San Antonio. The executive director of the Regional Maintenance Activity (RMC), Thomas J. Murphy, managing the work was relieved and transferred, as were the senior Waterfront Operations personnel. The Navy said that two contractors, Earl Industries, the prime contractor, and Fairbanks Morse, the engine manufacturer, were unwilling or unable to provide complete documentation into what was fixed on the ship and how. As a result, the Navy suspended Norfolk Ship Support Activity's oversight authority.

On 6 May 2011, the Navy canceled its maintenance contract with Earl Industries, citing, "improper work performed and concern regarding Earl Industries' quality assurance program and the company's ability to control the quality and documentation of work it performs."

On 26 May 2011, after 10 days of sea trials, the ship's power plants were declared fit for duty. The ship completed the trials on 15 June 2011 and was scheduled for a short training deployment from July to August 2011. In July 2011 San Antonios diesel engine's intercoolers were found to be mechanically deficient after the ship failed to gain full power causing the ship to return to be repaired. The repairs also found deficiencies in work performed by Earl Industries. The repairs were completed on 3 August 2011.

As of August 2011, the Navy now says that all problems with the ship's engines have been corrected including "foreign material exclusion plugs left in the drain piping system, use of incorrect material and improper installation and sealing of gaskets".

Awards
2012 Battle Effectiveness award.

Ship's coat of arms

The colors of the shield and star are adapted from the Texan state flag. The star also commemorates the "Lone Star" and first ship to bear the name San Antonio. Red is the color for valor and sacrifice, blue is for loyalty and white, purity of purpose. The Alamo honors the men who were killed fighting for the independence of Texas from Mexico. The bluebonnets refer to the beauty and majesty of Texas and the olive branch highlights the ship's peacekeeping mission. The trident and cannon represent the old and new weaponry. The cannonballs and nineteenth century cannon were similar weapons used by the brave men that defended the Alamo. The trident, symbol of sea prowess, also represents the "mobility triad" that USS San Antonio is built for. The crossed Navy and Marine Corps swords represent cooperation and teamwork of the United States Navy and the United States Marine Corps.

Gallery

References
This article contains information from the Naval Vessel Registry and various other U.S. Navy Web sites.

External links

navsource.org: USS San Antonio
National Defense Magazine article
USN Commissioning press release
Navy Times article on Post-commissioning Defects

 

San Antonio-class amphibious transport docks
Amphibious warfare vessels of the United States
Ships built in Bridge City, Louisiana
2003 ships